Eduardo Rubio Rodríguez (born November 13, 1986) is a Cuban rower. He and Adrián Oquendo placed 13th in the men's double sculls event at the 2016 Summer Olympics.

References

1986 births
Living people
Cuban male rowers
Olympic rowers of Cuba
Rowers at the 2016 Summer Olympics
Pan American Games medalists in rowing
Pan American Games gold medalists for Cuba
Pan American Games silver medalists for Cuba
Rowers at the 2015 Pan American Games
Medalists at the 2015 Pan American Games
20th-century Cuban people
21st-century Cuban people